Jan Fleissner (born 1 February 1998) is a Czech rower. He competed in the 2020 Summer Olympics.

References

1998 births
Living people
Rowers from Prague
Rowers at the 2020 Summer Olympics
Czech male rowers
Olympic rowers of the Czech Republic